Džore Držić (Italian: Giorgio Darsa) (February 6, 1461 – September 26, 1501) was a poet and playwright, one of the fathers of Croatian literature.

This respectable citizen of Dubrovnik, the uncle of the greatest Croatian playwright Marin Držić, the rector of the Church of All Saints, the chancellor of the Dubrovnik chapter, a contemporary of the poet Marko Marulić, created a poetic opus that became a primal expression of the linguistic form that would become the official Croatian language.

His poetry proves that his humanist roots had a beneficial effect on his poetic diction and other qualities, such as discreetness and spirituality. It makes his love poems very different from those of his older contemporary and eternal rival, Šiško Menčetić. Držić's Pjesni ljuvene (Love Poems) must have been very popular in Dubrovnik. By the time the noble Nikša Ranjina started filling his famous manuscript collection with love poems composed by young citizens of Dubrovnik for their ladies, Džore Držić was six years dead, but Ranjina included his poems. It means they were recited and remembered.

In fact, they are easy to remember. Some of his poems go beyond the conventional rhetorical style of Petrarchist poetry. Their graceful and warm verses, remindful of folk songs, are above almost everything else in the Ranjina's Miscellany, the oldest collection of Croatian Petrarchist lyric. Today's favorite is the refined and graceful poem Odiljam se (I Am Going Away), in verses of sixteen syllables, simple and warm, with a hint of bugarštica, a kind of a ballad.

His eclogue Radmio and Ljubmir, found only recently, was written in the late 15th century. It is the first Croatian play with a secular theme, opening a new period of the Croatian theater, which is reason enough to hail its writer as the initiator of the modern Croatian theater.

See also

 Republic of Ragusa
 List of notable Ragusans
 Dubrovnik
 Dalmatia
 History of Dalmatia

References

Sources
 Držić, Džore at lzmk.hr

External links

1461 births
1501 deaths
Croatian dramatists and playwrights
15th-century Croatian poets
Croatian Renaissance humanists
People from the Republic of Ragusa
Croatian male poets
People from Dubrovnik
Ragusan poets